Tapio Heikkilä (born 8 April 1990) is a Finnish football player.

Career

Club
In December 2015, Heikkilä signed a two-year contract with SJK. Little over a month later, 1 February 2016, and after only one appearance for SJK in the League Cup, Heikkilä moved to Norwegian Tippeligaen side IK Start.

Honours

Club

FC Honka
Veikkausliiga Runners-up (2): 2008, 2009
 Finnish Cup: 2012
 Finnish League Cup (2): 2010, 2011

Career statistics

References

External links
 Tapio Heikkilä at FC Honka 
 
 
  Profile at veikkausliiga.com

1990 births
Living people
Finnish footballers
FC Honka players
Helsingin Jalkapalloklubi players
Seinäjoen Jalkapallokerho players
IK Start players
Sandnes Ulf players
Veikkausliiga players
Eliteserien players
Norwegian First Division players
Finnish expatriate footballers
Expatriate footballers in Norway
Finnish expatriate sportspeople in Norway
Association football defenders
Finland international footballers
Footballers from Espoo